Lomatia is a genus of 12 species of evergreen flowering plants in the protea family Proteaceae. Within the family, they have been placed, alone, in their own subtribe, Lomatiinae according to Johnson & Briggs 1975 classification of the family and subsequently in Flora of Australia (1995).

The genus has a Pacific Rim distribution, with members native to eastern Australia and southern South America, forming a part of the Antarctic flora.

Genetic analysis using microsatellite markers showed that species found close together geographically are most closely related to each other. Lomatia dentata, then L. hirsuta and L. ferruginea all diverged successively from the lineage that gave rise to Australian species. The three Tasmanian species (with L. tasmanica sister to the other two species) are sister to the mainland Australian group. L. tasmanica of the three tasmania species, happens to be one of the most endangered species. On mainland Australia, the far northern L. fraxinifolia is sister to the other five species, all of which are found in southeastern Australia. L. fraseri and L. myricoides  are sister taxa, with L. ilicifolia sister to them, while L. arborescens and L. silaifolia are each other's closest relatives. Strong genomic filters may facilitate continued gene flow between species without the danger of assimilation.

Species
Lomatia arborescens - eastern Australia
Lomatia dentata - Chile, Argentina
Lomatia ferruginea - Chile, Argentina
Lomatia fraseri - eastern Australia
Lomatia milnerae - Queensland
Lomatia hirsuta - Chile, Peru, Argentina
Lomatia ilicifolia - eastern Australia
Lomatia myricoides - southeastern Australia
Lomatia occidentalis - (Eocene fossil records) Patagonia 
Lomatia patagonica - (Late Oligocene-Early Miocene (Ñirihuau Formation) fossil records) Patagonia
Lomatia preferruginea - (Middle Eocene fossil records (Ventana Formation) Patagonia
Lomatia polymorpha (mountain guitarplant) - Tasmania
Lomatia silaifolia - eastern Australia
Lomatia tasmanica (King's lomatia) - Tasmania
Lomatia tinctoria (guitarplant) - Tasmania

References

External links
 Pictures of Lomatia dentata, Lomatia ferruginea and Lomatia hirsuta from Chilebosque.
 pantherfile.uwm.edu/hoot/www/Prot.html - Hoot/Proteaceae

 
Proteaceae genera